Gregory Samuel Ain (March 28, 1908 – January 9, 1988) was an American architect active in the mid-20th century. Working primarily in the Los Angeles area, Ain is best known for bringing elements of modern architecture to lower- and medium-cost housing. He addressed "the common architectural problems of common people".

Esther McCoy said "Ain was an idealist who gave the better part of ten years to combatting outmoded planning and building codes, and hoary real estate practices."

Biography 

Born to Baer and Chiah Ain in Pittsburgh, Pennsylvania, in 1908, Ain was raised in the Lincoln Heights neighborhood of Los Angeles. For a short time during his childhood, the Ain family lived at Llano del Rio, an experimental collective farming colony in the Antelope Valley of California.

He was inspired to become an architect after visiting the Schindler House as a teenager. He attended the University of Southern California School of Architecture in 1927–28, but dropped out after feeling limited by the school's Beaux Arts training.

His primary influences were Rudolph Schindler and Richard Neutra. He worked for Neutra from 1930 to 1935, along with fellow apprentice Harwell Hamilton Harris, and contributed to Neutra's major projects of that period.

Following his collaborative relationship with Richard Neutra, in 1935 Ain cultivated an individual practice designing modest houses for working-class and middle class clients.

Ain was awarded a Guggenheim Fellowship in 1940 to study housing. During World War II, Ain was Chief Engineer for Charles and Ray Eames in the development of their well-known leg-splints and plywood chairs, including the DCW and LCW series.

The 1930s and 1940s represented Ain's most productive period. During this period, his principled quest to address "the common architectural problems of common people", prompted the implementation of flexible floor plans and open kitchens. In the 1940s, he formed a partnership with Joseph Johnson and Alfred Day in order to design large housing tracts. Major projects of this period included Community Homes, Park Planned Homes, Avenel Homes, and Mar Vista Housing. The Gregory Ain Mar Vista Tract became L.A.’s first Modern historic district in 2003. He collaborated with landscape architect Garrett Eckbo on each of these projects, which typify Mid-century modern design. Ain also practiced in a "loose partnership" with James Garrott for roughly 20 years, beginning in 1940. They designed their own small office building together on Hyperion Avenue in the Silver Lake neighborhood. Their projects attracted the attention of Philip Johnson, the curator of architecture at the Museum of Modern Art, who commissioned Ain to design and construct MoMA's second exhibition house in the museum's garden in 1950, following that of Marcel Breuer in 1949.

In the late early 1950s, Ain's practice was diminished as he was perceived as a communist. For example, in 1949 he was listed by the California Senate Factfinding Subcommittee on Un-American Activities as "among the committee's most notorious critics." The growing "Red Scare" caused him to lose several opportunities, including participation in John Entenza's Case Study Program.

Ain also taught architecture at USC after the war. Then, from 1963 to 1967, he served as the Dean of the Pennsylvania State University School of Architecture. He then returned to Los Angeles and died in 1988.

Ain's papers are kept at the Architecture and Design Collection, at the Art, Design & Architecture Museum, at the University of California, Santa Barbara.

Gregory Ain is the focus of a long standing project, The Bauhaus Ranch and documentary, No Place Like Utopia,  directed and produced by Christiane Robbins and Professor Katherine Lambert, AIA.  This film is based on their extensive and rigorous research that maintained that Ain's 1950 MoMA Exhibition House, "Our View of the Future", had never been destroyed as had been alleged by architectural historians.  They publicly offered their position in 2015 and materialized this thesis in their cross disciplinary installation, "This Future Has a Past", first exhibited at the 2016 Venice Architecture Biennial and then at the Center for Architecture, NYC in 2017.

Buildings 

 1936: Edwards House, Los Angeles, California
 1937: Ernst House, Los Angeles, California
 1937: Byler House, Mt. Washington (Los Angeles), California
 1937–39: Dunsmuir Flats, Los Angeles, California
 1938: Brownfield Medical Building, Los Angeles, California (later destroyed)
 1938: Beckman House, Los Angeles, California
 1939: Daniel House, Silver Lake (Los Angeles), California
 1939: Margaret and Harry Hay House, North Hollywood, California
 1939: Tierman House, Silver Lake (Los Angeles), California
 1939: Vorkapich Garden House, for Slavko Vorkapich, Beverly Hills, California (later destroyed)
 1941: Ain House, Hollywood, California
 1941: Orans House, Silver Lake (Los Angeles), California
 1942: Jocelyn and Jan Domela House, Tarzana, California
 1946: Park Planned Homes,  Altadena, California
 1947–48: Mar Vista Housing, Mar Vista (Los Angeles), California
 designated as a Historic Preservation Overlay Zone by the city of Los Angeles in 2003.
 1948: Avenel Homes (cooperative), Silver Lake, Los Angeles, California
 listed in the National Register of Historic Places in 2005.
 1948: Albert Tarter House, Los Feliz, Los Angeles, California
 1948: Hollywood Guilds and Unions Office Building, Los Angeles, California (later destroyed)
 1948: Miller House, Beverly Hills, California
 1948: Community Homes (cooperative), Reseda (Los Angeles), California (unbuilt)
 1949: Ain & Garrott Office, Silver Lake, Los Angeles, California
 1949: Schairer House, Los Angeles, California
 1950: Beckman House II, Sherman Oaks, California
 1950: Hurschler House, Pasadena, California (later destroyed)
 1950: MOMA Exhibition House, New York City
 1950: Walter Ralphs House, Pasadena, California
 1951: Ben Margolis House, Los Angeles, California
 1951: Leo Mesner House, Sherman Oaks, California
 1952: Richard "Dick" Tufeld House, Los Angeles, California
 1953 : Feldman House, Beverly Crest/Beverly Hills PO, California
 1962–63: Ernst House II, Vista, California
 1963: Kaye House, Tarzana, California
 1967: Ginoza House, State College, Pennsylvania

Awards and honors 
 Guggenheim Fellowship, 1940
 American Institute of Architects College of Fellows (FAIA)

References

Other sources

External links 
 www.marvistatract.org - Gregory Ain Mar Vista Tract Web Site
 Gregory Ain Model Home Redo & Add On
 LA Obscura: Ain Projects

Modernist architects from the United States
1908 births
1988 deaths
Jewish architects
Modernist architects
Modernist architecture in California
Architects from Los Angeles
Architects from Pittsburgh
USC School of Architecture alumni
20th-century American architects
Mid-century modern
People from Lincoln Heights, Los Angeles